Bengaluru Ramamurthy Chaya, known as B. R. Chaya, is an Indian, Kannada playback singer, stage performer and a popular Sugama Sangeetha singer from Karnataka state. She has performed pop, folk, devotional and bhavageethe (light music). She is recipient of Rajyotsava Prashasti  from the State Government of Karnataka and also Karnataka State Film Award for Best Female Playback Singer .

Early days and debut
Chaya was born to Ramamurthy and S. G. Janaki. she worked as a watch mechanic for a few years in HMT after doing a course in horology at RV College, and later represented Karnataka at a Doordarshan national competition in madras.

She is currently a judge on Gaana Chandana and has been doing virtual concerts since the outbreak of the COVID-19 pandemic.

Chaya is the first singer to receive the Karnataka State Film Award for Best Female Playback Singer for the song "Ruthumana samputadi" from the movie "Kaadina Benki" in 1988.

filmography

1980s

Awards and recognitions
 2010 – Karnataka Rajyotsava Prashasti
 1988 – Karnataka State Film Award for Best Female Playback Singer – Song: Ruthumana samputadi from Kaadina Benki
 1995 – Karnataka State Film Award for Best Female Playback Singer – Song: Ibbani tabbida ileyali from Rashmi

See also 
 Bangalore Latha
 B. K. Sumitra
 Rathnamala Prakash
 Chandrika Gururaj

References

External links

Living people
Singers from Bangalore
Kannada playback singers
Indian women playback singers
Indian women pop singers
Kannada people
Film musicians from Karnataka
Women musicians from Karnataka
20th-century Indian singers
21st-century Indian women singers
20th-century Indian women singers
21st-century Indian singers
Singers from Karnataka
Women artists from Karnataka
Recipients of the Rajyotsava Award 2010
1967 births